Songs for Sanity is the second solo studio album by American guitarist John 5. The album was released on September 13, 2005, through Shrapnel Records. It features guest appearances from Albert Lee and Steve Vai.

Track listing

Credits
John 5 – guitar, banjo, bass guitar (except on "Fiddler's"), associate producer album
Steve Vai – guitar on second half of each of the main two solos on "Perineum"
Albert Lee - guitar on the first solo on "Death Valley"
Larry Klein – bass guitar on "Fiddler's"
Josh Jones – bass guitar on "Fiddler's"
Rodger Carter – drums on tracks 3, 6, 8, 9, 10, and 12
Aaron Rossi – drums on tracks 1, 2, 4, 7, and 11
Sid Riggs – keyboards (except on tracks 6, 8, and 9), producer, engineer, programming, mixing album
Kevin Savigar – keyboards on tracks 6, 8, and 9, producer, additional engineering
Mike Varney – executive producer
Shaun Evans – mixing assistant engineer
Maryanne Bilham – photography
Dave Stepens – graphic design, layout
Tim Gennert – mastering album

John 5 (guitarist) albums
2005 albums
Instrumental albums
Shrapnel Records albums